In geometry, a snub dodecahedral prism or snub icosidodecahedral prism is a convex uniform polychoron (four-dimensional polytope).

It is one of 18 convex uniform polyhedral prisms created by using uniform prisms to connect pairs of Platonic solids or Archimedean solids in parallel hyperplanes, in this case a pair of snub dodecahedra.

Alternative names 
 Snub-icosidodecahedral dyadic prism (Norman W. Johnson) 
 Sniddip (Jonathan Bowers: for snub-dodecahedral prism) 
 Snub-icosidodecahedral hyperprism 
 Snub-dodecahedral prism 
 Snub-dodecahedral hyperprism

See also 
Snub dodecahedral antiprism ht0,1,2,3{5,3,2}, or  - A related nonuniform polychoron

External links 
 
 

4-polytopes